Coleophora bilineatella is a moth of the family Coleophoridae. It was described by Zeller in 1849. It is found from Germany to the Iberian Peninsula, Sardinia, Italy and Greece and from France to Romania.

The larvae feed on Dorycnium pentaphyllum, Dorycnium pentaphyllum germanicum and Dorycnium pentaphyllum herbaceum. Later, they create a very slender composite leaf case of  length, composed of 7-9 leaf fragments. The mouth angle is about 45°. Full-grown larvae can be found from June to April. Hibernation occurs at the foot of the hostplant.

References

External links
Lepiforum.de

bilineatella
Moths described in 1849
Moths of Europe
Taxa named by Philipp Christoph Zeller